Burano is an island in the Venetian Lagoon, northern Italy, near Torcello at the northern end of the lagoon, known for its lace work and brightly coloured homes. The primary economy is tourism.

Geography

The island is linked to Mazzorbo by a bridge. The current population of Burano is about 2,400. Originally, there were five islands and a fourth canal that was filled to become via e piazza Baldassare Galuppi, joining the former islands of San Martino Destra and San Martino Sinistra.

Burano has historically been subdivided into five sestieri, much like Venice. They correspond to the five original islands. The sixth sestiere is neighboring Mazzorbo:

Burano has a high population density, calculated at more than 13,000 per square kilometer, or more than twenty times the density of neighboring Mazzorbo. It is almost entirely covered by residential buildings, with few small green areas.

History

The island was probably settled by the Romans, and in the 6th century was occupied by people from Altino, who named it for one of the gates of their former city. Two stories are attributed to how the city obtained its name.

Although the island soon became a thriving settlement, it was administered from Torcello and had none of the privileges of that island or of Murano. It rose in importance only in the 16th century, when women on the island began making lace with needles, being introduced to such a trade via Venetian-ruled Cyprus. When Leonardo da Vinci visited in 1481, he visited the small town of Pano Lefkara and purchased a cloth for the main altar of the Duomo di Milano. The lace was soon exported across Europe, but trade began to decline in the 18th century and the industry did not revive until 1872, when a school of lacemaking was opened. Lacemaking on the island boomed again, but few now make lace in the traditional manner as it is extremely time-consuming and therefore expensive.

Main sights

Burano is also known for its small, brightly painted houses, which are popular with artists. The colours of the houses follow a specific system, originating from the golden age of its development. If someone wishes to paint their home, one must send a request to the government, who will respond by making notice of the certain colours permitted for that lot.

Other attractions include the church of San Martino, with a leaning campanile and a painting by Giambattista Tiepolo (Crucifixion, 1727), the Oratorio di Santa Barbara and the Museum and School of Lacemaking.

Transport
The island forms part of the Actv waterbus network. The following lines connect to Burano:
9 (Burano-Torcello)
12 (Fondamente Nove-Murano-Burano-Treporti-Punta Sabbioni)
14 (S.Zaccaria-Lido SME-Punta Sabbioni-Burano)
A night service also operates.

Gallery

See also
 List of islands of Italy

References

External links
 

 
Islands of the Venetian Lagoon
Frazioni of the Metropolitan City of Venice
Geography of Venice
20th-century establishments in Venice
Former municipalities of Veneto